The Dallas County Courthouse, built in 1892 of red sandstone with rusticated marble accents,  is a historic governmental building located at 100 South Houston Street in Dallas, Texas. Also known as the Old Red Courthouse, it became the Old Red Museum, a local history museum, in 2007.   It was designed in the Richardsonian Romanesque style of architecture  by architect Max A. Orlopp, Jr. of the Little Rock, Arkansas based firm Orlopp & Kusener. In 1966 it was replaced by a newer courthouse building nearby. On December 12, 1976, it was added to the National Register of Historic Places. In 2005–2007 the building was renovated.

Gallery

See also

List of National Historic Landmarks in Texas
National Register of Historic Places listings in Dallas County, Texas
Recorded Texas Historic Landmarks in Dallas County
List of Dallas Landmarks
List of county courthouses in Texas

References

External links

Museums in Dallas
History museums in Texas
County courthouses in Texas
Buildings and structures in Dallas
Government buildings completed in 1891
Courthouses on the National Register of Historic Places in Texas
National Register of Historic Places in Dallas
Clock towers in Texas
Sandstone buildings in the United States
Richardsonian Romanesque architecture in Texas